Zhuang Xiaoyan (庄晓岩; born 4 May 1969) is a Chinese judo coach, former international judo champion, and winner of the gold medal for judo in the women's +72 kg (heavyweight) division at the 1992 Summer Olympics. Her medal was China's first Olympic gold medal in judo.

Early life
Zhuang was born on 4 May 1969 in Shenyang, Liaoning, China. Her parents worked in a fertiliser plant. She initially trained in shot put, discus, and javelin, but changed to judo at the age of 14 years. A year later, she was selected for the Liaoning provincial judo team. Her nickname amongst her fellow athletes was 'Tiger.'

Competitive judo career

In 1986, Zhuang joined the Chinese national judo team. That same year, she came second in the National Judo Championship. In 1987, she was champion in the women's open class at the National Games, and in 1988, she took victory in the same class at the International Judo Championships. Through the late 1980s, she also competed in tournaments at Fukuoka. Her coach for international competition was Liu Yongfu. She was listed at 173 cm (5' 8") in height and 98 kg (217 lb.) in weight.

More international victories followed for Zhuang at the 1990 Asian Games in Beijing and the 1991 World Judo Championships in Barcelona. At the 1992 Summer Olympics, Zhuang defeated Estela Rodríguez Villanueva from Cuba to win the gold medal in the women's +72 kg division for judo. This was China's first Olympic gold medal in judo, and was the first of three consecutive victories for China in this competition—Sun Fuming (1996) and Yuan Hua (2000) also won Olympic gold medals in the heaviest women's division in judo.

Following her Olympic victory, Zhuang married and had twin daughters, but separated from her husband a few years later. She retired from judo competition in 1995.

Post-competition career
Zhuang was one of the torchbearers in the Olympic torch relay for the 2008 Summer Olympics in Beijing. Her fingerprints and footprints are preserved in the flagstones of Beidaihe Olympic Avenue Park, Beidaihe District, along with those of 44 other Chinese Olympic champions. She now trains judo competitors at the Liaoning provincial institute of sports technology.

See also
 Chen Zhong
 China at the 1992 Summer Olympics
 Judo at the Summer Olympics

References

External links
 
 China Daily: Zhuang Xiaoyan contains a photograph of Zhuang (c. 1992).
 DataSports163: 庄晓岩  contains a photograph of Zhuang (c. 2005).

 

Living people
1969 births
Judoka at the 1992 Summer Olympics
Judoka trainers
Olympic gold medalists for China
Olympic judoka of China
Olympic medalists in judo
Sportspeople from Shenyang
Asian Games medalists in judo
Judoka at the 1990 Asian Games
Chinese female judoka
Medalists at the 1992 Summer Olympics
Asian Games gold medalists for China
Medalists at the 1990 Asian Games